Working Man's Dick is a compilation album by the band Supreme Dicks, released through September 13, 1994 on Freek Records.

Track listing

Personnel 
Supreme Dicks
Mark Hanson – bass guitar, drums, vocals
Daniel Oxenberg – guitar, vocals
Steven Shavel – slide guitar, vocals
Jon Shere – guitar, vocals
Jim Spring – guitar
Production and additional personnel
Lev – cover art

References

External links 
 

1994 albums
Supreme Dicks albums